The coat of arms of Lebanon consists of a red shield with a white bend sinister on which is placed a cedar tree. It is very similar to the flag of Lebanon, with the exception of the Spanish fess on the flag being changed into a bend sinister.

The coat of arms was never officially adopted, but is used de facto.

References

National symbols of Lebanon
Lebanon
Lebanon